RCI may refer to one of the following.
RCI (company), a Timeshare Exchange Company
Racer's Choice Inc., a manufacturer of racing automotive products, Texas, USA
Radio Canada International
Radio Caraïbes International, a radio station in Martinique and Guadeloupe
Radio Caribbean International, a radio station in St. Lucia
Rapid Continuous Improvement, a process improvement practice based on the Japanese concept of Kaizen
RCI Engineering, a manufacturer of agricultural equipment, including the Ag-Bag product line
Rehabilitation Council of India, an Indian council for the disabled
Renault Crédit International, former name of the French company RCI Banque
Research Centre Imarat, an Indian defence laboratory under DRDO responsible for the development of missiles. (See IGMDP)
Residential/Commercial/Industrial Meter - a common metric in City Building computer games
Revival Centres International,  a Pentecostal church founded in Australia
Riverside College, Inc., a medical college in the Philippines
Roadway Characteristics Inventory, a database containing information on roads
Rogers Communications Inc., a Canadian communications company
Royal Canadian Institute, an organization dedicated to the advancement of science.
Royal Caribbean International, a cruise line based in Florida, USA